The Len Ceglarski Award is an annual award given out at the conclusion of the Hockey East regular season to the player most exemplifying the qualities of sportsmanship on the ice in the conference as voted by the head coaches of each Hockey East team. The award was created and named in honor of long-time Boston College head coach Len Ceglarski who retired following the 1991–92 season.

The Len Ceglarski Award was first bestowed in 1992 and every year thereafter.

No goaltender has ever won the award in league history.

Only Steve Kariya, Joe Gambardella, and Jacob Bryson have received the award more than once, Gambardella and Bryson winning in two consecutive years, and Kariya doing so in three consecutive years from 1996–97 to 1998–99.

Award winners

Winners by school

Winners by position

See also
Hockey East Awards

References

General

Specific

External links
Hockey East Awards (Incomplete)

Hockey East
College ice hockey trophies and awards in the United States
Sportsmanship trophies and awards
Boston College Eagles men's ice hockey